Felipe Fuentes (born May 25, 1971) is an American lobbyist and former Democratic politician and businessman from the San Fernando Valley in the U.S. state of California, formerly a member of the Los Angeles City Council from the 7th district. Fuentes resigned his seat on the Los Angeles City Council 10 months before the end of the term in order to start working as a lobbyist.

Fuentes won election to the California State Assembly for the 39th district on a May 15, 2007 special election. He slightly exceeded the 50%+1 margin needed to avoid a runoff. Prior to serving in the Assembly, Fuentes served as Chief of Staff to then Los Angeles City Councilman Alex Padilla.

Biography
Fuentes was born in Colorado Springs, CO  in 1971. He majored in political science at UCLA and received his bachelor's degree in (1994). He received his masters in business administration (MBA)from Pepperdine University in (2004).

Fuentes began his career promoting immigrant and children's rights at the Center for Human Rights and Constitutional Law. In 1999, Fuentes began serving the 7th council district of Los Angeles as a field deputy to then City Councilmember Alex Padila. In 2001, he worked on then City Attorney James Hahn's campaign for Mayor. After Hahn's election, he was appointed Deputy Mayor of the San Fernando Valley. Fuentes managed the Mayor's Office of the Neighborhood Advocate, Volunteer Corps, Constituent Services, and the Targeted Neighborhood Initiative. He was the Mayor's liaison to the Department of Neighborhood Empowerment, Animal Services, and the Department of Building & Safety.

As Chief of Staff to Los Angeles City Council President Alex Padilla, Fuentes helped establish a pilot program to implement the "Safe Routes to Schools" initiative in the Northeast San Fernando Valley. He worked to help bring the first new police station to the San Fernando Valley in twenty-five years, and to create effective anti-gang programs.

Felipe is a lifelong resident of the Northeast San Fernando Valley of Los Angeles and now resides in Sylmar, Los Angeles with his wife, Lena Wu-Fuentes.  Lena and Felipe are parents to a daughter.

References

External links
Join California - Felipe Fuentes

1971 births
Hispanic and Latino American state legislators in California
Living people
Democratic Party members of the California State Assembly
People from Sylmar, Los Angeles
Pepperdine University alumni
San Fernando High School alumni
University of California, Los Angeles alumni
Los Angeles City Council members
2012 United States presidential electors
21st-century American politicians